Ben Askren (born July 18, 1984) is an American former professional mixed martial artist and amateur wrestler. Askren was the former Bellator and ONE Welterweight Champion, remaining undefeated for over a decade before competing in the Ultimate Fighting Championship (UFC).

An accomplished grappler, he was the 2008 US Olympic Team Member and National champion and the 2005 Pan American champion in freestyle wrestling, a two–time NCAA Division I national champion (four–time finalist), and three–time Big 12 Conference champion (four–time finalist) for the Missouri Tigers, and was the second wrestler to secure multiple Dan Hodge Trophies (the wrestling equivalent of the Heisman Trophy) in folkstyle wrestling. He was also a world champion in submission wrestling.

Wrestling career

Early career and folkstyle 
Askren was introduced to the sport of wrestling by his father Chuck at age six, but only took the sport seriously when he started the sixth grade and joined a club. During high school, he became a two–time WIAA state champion out of Arrowhead High School in Wisconsin. Nationally, he placed in the podium at multiple US National tournaments in folkstyle, freestyle and Greco-Roman.

In college, Askren wrestled for the Missouri Tigers at 174 pounds, where he was teammates with future UFC Welterweight Champion Tyron Woodley and future Bellator Lightweight Champion Michael Chandler. During his freshman campaign (2003–2004), Askren won the Big 12 Conference Championships and placed second at the NCAA Championships, with both matches being against standout from Oklahoma State Chris Pendleton. During his sophomore campaign (2004–2005), Askren placed second at both the NCAA and Big 12 Championships, losing both championship matches to Pendleton. After being a runner–up for half of his career, Askren shined as a junior and a senior, becoming the third athlete to ever earn the Dan Hodge Trophy in multiple occasions, as he received the award in both seasons after compiling a combined 87–0 record. Throughout his career, Askren defeated multiple NCAA champions such as Jake Herbert and Keith Gavin. After a legendary run, Askren graduated with a 153–8 record (seven of the losses were handled by Chris Pendleton and one of them by Ryan Lange), two Dan Hodge Trophies and a Schalles Award, two NCAA championships, three Big 12 Championships and 91 pins, the third most in NCAA Division I history.

One of the most dominant collegiate wrestlers of all time, Askren's "funky" style relied heavily in unorthodox scrambling techniques and was known for his pinning ability as well as his massive afro. His peculiar and uncommon body shape for a wrestler allowed him to complete moves that his competition could not, thus constantly putting them in awkward positions. On January 9, 2012, it was announced that Askren would be one of six new inductees to the University of Missouri Intercollegiate Athletics Hall of Fame.

Freestyle 
Despite his style relying heavily in folkstyle rules, Askren was able to adapt fairly well to freestyle wrestling after his graduation from college. After working on adapting his style during 2007, Askren claimed the US National Championship in April and followed up by making the US Olympic Team in June. At the 2008 Summer Olympics, Askren defeated Hungarian István Veréb via fall in the first round, but fell in the quarterfinals to Cuba's Iván Fundora on points. Fundora was then defeated by Russia's Buvaisar Saitiev, thus eliminating Askren's chances of competing for a medal.

Askren was then asked if inexperience in the new ruleset was a factor, but he responded; "That wasn't it," he said with tears in his eyes, "I just wasn't good enough. I sucked."

Post-Olympic career 
Although Askren decided to pursue a career in MMA after the Olympics, he continued to compete in wrestling occasionally. In 2010, he avenged his Olympic loss by defeating Fundora in the semifinals of the Cerro Pelado International in Cuba. This came shortly after Askren won the Dave Schultz Memorial International. Later the same year, Askren defeated 2009 world silver medalist Jake Herbert in a folkstyle rules match at the Midlands Tournament. Askren also competed in the Agon Wrestling Championships and the Flo Premier League. In May 2019, Askren lost by technical superiority to five–time World and Olympic champion Jordan Burroughs in the annual Beat the Streets benefit event.

After spending a little over a year in retirement from his MMA career, Askren announced a successful hip surgery in 2020 and revealed that he intends to return to competitive freestyle wrestling soon.

Mixed martial arts career

Early career 
Askren made his professional MMA debut on February 7, 2009. It was held by Headhunter Productions at the Holiday Inn Select Executive Center in Columbia, Missouri. He defeated Josh Flowers via TKO early in the first round.

Askren had his second fight at Patriot Act 2 in Columbia, Missouri. He defeated Mitchell Harris via submission by arm triangle. The fight was at a catchweight of 175 pounds.

Grappling 
Askren competed at the 2009 ADCC Submission Wrestling World Championship from September 26–27, in Barcelona, Spain. He won his first match against Toni Linden by arm triangle choke. He lost his second match to Pablo Popovitch, a veteran grappler he had trained with the previous summer, by figure four footlock early in the match. Popovitch went on to win the championship in the under 77 kg (169 lb) division.

Askren also competed at the 2009 FILA 2° World Grappling Championship. Askren faced the 2008 World Champion, Jacob Volkmann, in the 84 kg no-gi division. Askren out-wrestled Volkmann and won gold in the category.

Bellator Fighting Championships 
Askren was a participant in Bellator Fighting Championships Season 2 Welterweight Tournament. In his first fight, Askren defeated Ryan Thomas via technical submission at Bellator 14 on April 15, 2010. The outcome of the fight was controversial because Thomas protested the stoppage as soon as Askren released the choke.

After Jim Wallhead was pulled from the tournament, Thomas was given another chance to compete. Thomas defeated Jacob McClintock by TKO in the first round at Bellator 15 and was awarded a rematch with Askren. When the two fought at Bellator 19, Askren came out victorious again with a unanimous decision after controlling Thomas with wrestling for three rounds.

At Bellator 22, Askren defeated Dan Hornbuckle via unanimous decision with his superior wrestling dominating Hornbuckle for all three rounds, becoming the Bellator Season Two Welterweight Tournament Champion.

On October 21, 2010 in Philadelphia Askren took on the Bellator Welterweight Champion Lyman Good. Despite being hit with a brutal upkick and almost getting caught in a triangle choke with one minute left, he was able to take down and control Good in every round. Askren won via unanimous decision (49–46, 48–47, and 50–45) to win the Bellator Welterweight Championship.

Askren next returned at Bellator 40 to fight and defeat Nick Thompson after taking down and controlling Thompson for all three rounds. Although Askren started off quickly in the third round with a spinning back fist and several other strikes, he was caught with an overhand right by Thompson, causing Askren to take down and control Thompson for the remainder of the round. Askren went on to win by unanimous decision (30–26, 30–27, and 30–27).

Following his unanimous decision win over  Thompson in a non-title affair at Bellator 40 in Newkirk, Oklahoma, Askren revealed that he was moving to Milwaukee to train under Duke Roufus at Roufusport.

Askren successfully defended his title against season 4 welterweight tournament winner Jay Hieron at Bellator 56 following a close split decision.

Askren successfully defended his title against season 5 welterweight tournament winner Douglas Lima at Bellator 64 on April 6, 2012, on Good Friday at the Caesars in Windsor, Canada.

Next for Askren was a title defense against Karl Amoussou, the fight taking place at Bellator 86 on January 24, 2013. Askren once again used his top control wrestling to shut down his opponents grappling, and opened a cut on Amoussou's forehead with an elbow strike. The doctor stepped in between the third and fourth rounds, judging the cut too severe for Amoussou to continue.

In the final fight of his contract, Askren faced tournament winner Andrey Koreshkov at Bellator 97. He dominated the fight with his wrestling and ground strikes, outstriking his opponent by a wide 248 to 3 margin before winning via TKO in the fourth round.

On November 14, 2013, following a negotiation period, Bellator announced they had released Askren from the company, and that he was now an unrestricted free agent.

ONE Championship 
On December 9, 2013, Askren signed a two-year/six-fight contract with ONE Championship.

Askren met Bakhtiyar Abbasov, who had been riding a nine-fight win streak, in the main event of ONE FC: Honor and Glory on May 30. He won the fight via submission (arm-triangle choke) in the first round, and proceeded to call out ONE champion Nobutatsu Suzuki, stating "Suzuki is going to bring me my belt. He can put it in the middle of the cage and give it to me, or I can take it the hard way!”

Askren faced Suzuki at ONE Fighting Championship: Reign of Champions on August 29, 2014. He won the fight via TKO due to strikes in the first round to become the new ONE Welterweight Champion.

Askren faced Luis Santos in the main event at ONE Championship: Valor of Champions on April 24.  The fight was ruled "no contest" after an accidental eye poke from Askren at 2:19 of round 1 rendered Santos unable to continue.

In the next fight Askren beat Russia's Nikolay Aleksakhin at the ONE Championship: Global Warriors on April 15, 2016 by unanimous decision.

Askren then fought Agilan Thani at the ONE Championship: Dynasty of Heroes on May 26, 2017. He won the fight via submission due to an arm-triangle choke in the first round.

Askren then faced Zebaztian Kadestam at the ONE Championship: Shanghai on September 7, 2017. He won the fight via TKO due to punches.

Askren then faced fellow veteran Shinya Aoki at ONE Championship: Immortal Pursuit on November 24, 2017. Prior to the bout, he claimed this would be his last fight. He won the fight via TKO due to punches early in the first round. He retired from the sport after the win.

Askren left the door open for one last match if he was made an offer to "prove I'm the best welterweight in the world". He discussed the possibility of facing Georges St-Pierre, claiming "He doesn't want a title fight. He just wants to build on his legacy," adding that he felt he would be the perfect opponent for St. Pierre. The contest never materialized.

Ultimate Fighting Championship 
On November 3, 2018, it was announced that the UFC had signed Askren under the "trade UFC and One Championship agreement", in exchange for former UFC Flyweight Champion Demetrious Johnson.

Askren made his UFC debut against the former UFC Welterweight Champion Robbie Lawler on March 2, 2019 at UFC 235. The bout was initially scheduled for UFC 233, but after the event was cancelled the fight was rescheduled for UFC 235. Askren won the fight via bulldog choke in the first round, through a controversial stoppage by referee Herb Dean. Replays appear to show Lawler's arm going limp and giving a thumbs up right after, which some attribute to Lawler slipping in and out of consciousness. Although controversial, Nevada Athletic Commission executive director Bob Bennett explained that the commission had "no problem" with Dean's decision to stop the fight.

Askren faced long–time veteran Jorge Masvidal on July 6, 2019, at UFC 239. Leading up to the match, Askren utilized heavy trash-talk as usual. He was knocked out with a flying knee five seconds into the first round, the fastest knockout in UFC history, ending his undefeated run.

Askren faced ADCC World Champion and MMA veteran Demian Maia on October 26, 2019, at UFC on ESPN+ 20, and lost the fight via technical submission in round three. This fight earned him the Fight of the Night award.

On November 18, 2019, Askren announced his official retirement from mixed martial arts competition.

Boxing career 

After a back-and-forth on social media, Askren fought YouTube personality Jake Paul in a boxing match on April 17, 2021, losing by TKO. The legitimacy of the match was questioned by fans and fellow MMA fighters. The match reportedly generated at least 1.45 million pay-per-view buys as per Triller. The legitimacy of the pay-per-view numbers have also been questioned by multiple personalities such as UFC president Dana White.

Personal life 
He is competitive in the sport of disc golf. In 2009, Askren finished ninth in the Amateur World Championships. Askren is sponsored by Discraft. He is also involved in cryptocurrency investing.

Askren co-hosts a few weekly wrestling podcasts: 'FloWrestling Radio Live' with Christian Pyles on FloWrestling, 'The Funky & FRB Show' with Front Row Brian on Rokfin and 'The T-Row & Funky Show' with two–time NCAA champion Tommy Rowlands.

Askren has stated that he is not religious.

Championships and accomplishments

Mixed martial arts 
Ultimate Fighting Championship
Fight of the Night (One time) 
 Bellator Fighting Championships
 Bellator Welterweight Championship (One time)
Four successful title defenses
 Bellator Season 2 Welterweight Tournament Championship
 Most consecutive title defenses in Bellator history (4)
 Most successful title defenses in Bellator history (4)
Undefeated (9-0)
 ONE Championship
 ONE Welterweight Championship (One time)
Three successful title defenses
undefeated (7-0)

Disc golf 
 Professional Disc Golf Association
 2011 United States Amateur Disc Golf Championship 2nd Place
 2009 PDGA Amateur World Doubles Championships Advanced 4th Place
 2009 St. Louis Open Advanced 2nd Place
 2009 Mighty MO Advanced 1st Place
 2009 First Class Challenge 3rd place
 2006 Alabama Amateur Open Intermediate 3rd Place
 2005 Highnoon at Indiantown Intermediate 2nd Place

Submission grappling 
 Abu Dhabi Combat Club
 2009 ADCC Submission Wrestling World Championships Quarterfinalist
 International Federation of Associated Wrestling Styles
 FILA 2009 Grappling World Championships Senior No-Gi Gold Medalist
 USA Wrestling
 FILA World Team Trials Senior No-Gi Winner (2009)

Amateur wrestling 
 International Federation of Associated Wrestling Styles
 2010 Cerro Pelado International Senior Freestyle Silver Medalist
 2010 Dave Schultz Memorial International Open Senior Freestyle Gold Medalist
 2009 Hargobind International Senior Freestyle Gold Medalist
 2009 Sunkist Kids International Open Senior Freestyle Silver Medalist
 2008 Kyiv International Senior Freestyle Bronze Medalist
 2007 NYAC Holiday International Open Senior Freestyle Gold Medalist
 2007 Hargobind International Tournament Senior Freestyle Gold Medalist
 2005 Pan American Championships Senior Freestyle Gold Medalist
 USA Wrestling
 USA Senior Freestyle Olympic Team Trials Winner (2008)
 USA Junior Freestyle World Team Trials Winner (2004)
 USA Senior Freestyle National Championship (2008)
 ASICS Tiger High School All-American (2002)
 West Junior Freestyle Regional Championship (2002)
 Northern Plains Junior Freestyle Regional Championship (2001, 2002)
 National Collegiate Athletic Association
 NCAA Division I Collegiate National Champion (2006, 2007)
 NCAA Division I All-American (2004, 2005, 2006, 2007) 4x NCAA Finalist
 Big 12 Conference Championship (2004, 2006, 2007)
 Dan Hodge Trophy Collegiate Wrestler of the Year (2006, 2007)
 University of Missouri Intercollegiate Athletics Hall of Fame (2012)
 National Wrestling Coaches Association
 Schalles Award Top Collegiate Pinner of the Year (2006, 2007)
 National High School Coaches Association
 NHSCA Senior High School National Championship Runner-up (2002)
 NHSCA Senior All-American (2002)
 Wisconsin Interscholastic Athletic Association
 WIAA Division I High School State Championship (2000, 2001)
 WIAA Division I All-State (1999, 2000, 2001)
 Classic 8 Conference Championship (1999, 2000, 2001, 2002)
George Tragos/Lou Thesz Professional Wrestling Hall of Fame
George Tragos Award (2018)

Mixed martial arts record 

|-
|Loss
|align=center| 19–2 (1)
|Demian Maia
|Technical Submission (rear-naked choke)
|UFC Fight Night: Maia vs. Askren 
|
|align=center|3
|align=center|3:54
|Kallang, Singapore 
|  
|-
| Loss
| align=center| 19–1 (1)
| Jorge Masvidal
| KO (flying knee)
| UFC 239
| 
| align=center|1
| align=center|0:05
| Las Vegas, Nevada, United States
| 
|-
| Win
| align=center| 19–0 (1)
| Robbie Lawler
|  Technical Submission (bulldog choke) 
| UFC 235
| 
| align=center|1
| align=center|3:20
| Las Vegas, Nevada, United States
|
|-
| Win
| align=center| 18–0 (1)
| Shinya Aoki
| TKO (punches)
| ONE Championship 62: Immortal Pursuit
| 
| align=center| 1
| align=center| 0:57
| Kallang, Singapore
| 
|-
| Win
| align=center | 17–0 (1)
| Zebaztian Kadestam
| TKO (punches)
| ONE Championship 58: Shanghai
| 
| align=center | 2
| align=center | 4:09
| Shanghai, China
| 
|-
| Win
| align=center | 16–0 (1)
| Agilan Thani
| Submission (arm-triangle choke)
| ONE Championship 54: Dynasty of Heroes
| 
| align=center | 1
| align=center | 2:20
| Kallang, Singapore
| 
|-
| Win
| align=center | 15–0 (1)
| Nikolay Aleksakhin
| Decision (unanimous)
| ONE Championship 41: Global Rivals
| 
| align=center | 5
| align=center | 5:00
| Pasay, Philippines
| 
|-
| NC
| align=center | 14–0 (1)
| Luis Santos
| NC (accidental eye poke)
| ONE Championship 26: Valor of Champions
| 
| align=center | 1
| align=center | 2:19
| Pasay, Philippines
| 
|-
| Win
| align=center | 14–0
| Nobutatsu Suzuki
| TKO (punches)
| ONE FC 19: Reign of Champions
| 
| align=center | 1
| align=center | 1:24
| Dubai, United Arab Emirates
| 
|-
| Win
| align=center | 13–0
| Bakhtiyar Abbasov
| Submission (arm-triangle choke)
| ONE FC 16: Honor and Glory
| 
| align=center | 1
| align=center | 4:21
| Kallang, Singapore
|
|-
| Win
| align=center | 12–0
| Andrey Koreshkov
| TKO (punches)
| Bellator 97
| 
| align=center | 4
| align=center | 2:58
| Rio Rancho, New Mexico, United States
| 
|-
| Win
| align=center | 11–0
| Karl Amoussou
| TKO (doctor stoppage)
| Bellator 86
| 
| align=center | 3
| align=center | 5:00
| Thackerville, Oklahoma, United States
| 
|-
| Win
| align=center | 10–0
| Douglas Lima
| Decision (unanimous)
| Bellator 64
| 
| align=center | 5
| align=center | 5:00
| Windsor, Ontario, Canada
| 
|-
| Win
| align=center | 9–0
| Jay Hieron
| Decision (split)
| Bellator 56
| 
| align=center | 5
| align=center | 5:00
| Kansas City, Kansas, United States
| 
|-
| Win
| align=center | 8–0
| Nick Thompson
| Decision (unanimous)
| Bellator 40
| 
| align=center | 3
| align=center | 5:00
| Newkirk, Oklahoma, United States
| 
|-
| Win
| align=center | 7–0
| Lyman Good
| Decision (unanimous)
| Bellator 33
| 
| align=center | 5
| align=center | 5:00
| Philadelphia, Pennsylvania, United States
| 
|-
| Win
| align=center | 6–0
| Dan Hornbuckle
| Decision (unanimous)
| Bellator 22
| 
| align=center | 3
| align=center | 5:00
| Kansas City, Missouri, United States
| 
|-
| Win
| align=center | 5–0
|Ryan Thomas
| Decision (unanimous)
| Bellator 19
| 
| align=center | 3
| align=center | 5:00
| Grand Prairie, Texas, United States
| 
|-
| Win
| align=center | 4–0
|Ryan Thomas
| Technical Submission (guillotine choke)
| Bellator 14
| 
| align=center | 1
| align=center | 2:40
| Chicago, Illinois, United States
| 
|-
| Win
| align=center | 3–0
| Matt Delanoit
| Submission (north-south choke)
| Max Fights DM: Ballroom Brawl
| 
| align=center | 1
| align=center | 1:15
| Des Moines, Iowa, United States
|
|-
| Win
| align=center | 2–0
| Mitchell Harris
| Submission (arm-triangle choke)
| Headhunter Productions: The Patriot Act 2
| 
| align=center | 1
| align=center | 1:27
| Columbia, Missouri, United States
| 
|-
| Win
| align=center | 1–0
| Josh Flowers
| TKO (punches)
| Headhunter Productions: The Patriot Act
| 
| align=center | 1
| align=center | 1:25
| Columbia, Missouri, United States
|

Freestyle record

|-
!  Res.
!  Record
!  Opponent
!  Score
!  Date
!  Event
!  Location
|-
|Loss
|31–11
|align=left| Jordan Burroughs
|style="font-size:88%"|TF 0–11
|style="font-size:88%"|May 6, 2019
|style="font-size:88%"|2019 Beat The Streets: Grapple at the Garden
|style="text-align:left;font-size:88%;" |
 New York City, New York
|-
|Loss
|31–10
|align=left| Clayton Foster
|style="font-size:88%"|3–10
|style="font-size:88%"|January 20, 2015
|style="font-size:88%"|Flo Premier League IV
|style="text-align:left;font-size:88%;" |
 Wales, Wisconsin
|-
|Win
|31–9
|align=left| Michael Poeta
|style="font-size:88%"|OT 11–10
|style="font-size:88%"|January 26, 2014
|style="font-size:88%"|Agon III
|style="text-align:left;font-size:88%;" |
 Whitewater, Wisconsin
|-
|Win
|30–9
|align=left| Quentin Wright
|style="font-size:88%"|22–8
|style="font-size:88%"|October 27, 2013
|style="font-size:88%"|Agon I
|style="text-align:left;font-size:88%;" |
 Las Vegas, Nevada
|-
! style=background:white colspan=7 |
|-
|Loss
|29–9
|align=left| Travis Paulson
|style="font-size:88%"|0–1, 1–3
|style="font-size:88%" rowspan=2|June 11, 2010
|style="font-size:88%" rowspan=2|2010 US World Team Trials
|style="text-align:left;font-size:88%;" rowspan=2| Council Bluffs, Iowa
|-
|Win
|29–8
|align=left| Terry Madden
|style="font-size:88%"|1–0, 4–1
|-
|Win
|28–8
|align=left| Moza Fay
|style="font-size:88%"|TF 9–2
|style="font-size:88%"|May 13, 2010
|style="font-size:88%"|2010 Beat The Streets: Battle on the Intrepid
|style="text-align:left;font-size:88%;" |
 New York City, New York
|-
! style=background:white colspan=7 |
|-
|Win
|27–8
|align=left| Trent Paulson
|style="font-size:88%"|Fall
|style="font-size:88%" rowspan=5|February 5, 2010
|style="font-size:88%" rowspan=5|2010 Dave Schultz Memorial International Open
|style="text-align:left;font-size:88%;" rowspan=5| Colorado Springs, Colorado
|-
|Win
|26–8
|align=left| Rashid Kurbanov
|style="font-size:88%"|Fall
|-
|Win
|25–8
|align=left| Mathew Jud Gentry
|style="font-size:88%"|1–2, 5–0, 4–0
|-
|Win
|24–8
|align=left| Brian Surage
|style="font-size:88%"|5–0, 6–0
|-
|Win
|23–8
|align=left| Airam Gonzalez Garcia
|style="font-size:88%"|Fall
|-
! style=background:white colspan=7 |
|-
|Loss
|22–8
|align=left| Chris Pendleton
|style="font-size:88%"|1–2, 1–1
|style="font-size:88%" rowspan=4|October 24, 2009
|style="font-size:88%" rowspan=4|2009 Sunkist International Open
|style="text-align:left;font-size:88%;" rowspan=4| Phoenix, Arizona
|-
|Win
|22–7
|align=left| Keith Gavin
|style="font-size:88%"|4–1, 7–4
|-
|Win
|21–7
|align=left| Benjamin Wissel
|style="font-size:88%"|1–0, 7–0
|-
|Win
|20–7
|align=left| Matt Wilps
|style="font-size:88%"|Fall
|-
! style=background:white colspan=7 |
|-
|Loss
|19–7
|align=left |  Ivan Fundora
|style="font-size:88%"|1–3, 0–4
|style="font-size:88%" rowspan=2|August 12, 2008
|style="font-size:88%" rowspan=2|2008 Summer Olympics
|style="text-align:left;font-size:88%;" rowspan=2| Beijing, China
|-
|Win
|19–6
|align=left | István Veréb
|style="font-size:88%"|Fall
|-
! style=background:white colspan=7 |
|-
|Win
|18–6
|align=left | Tyrone Lewis
|style="font-size:88%"|2–6, 2–0, 1–0
|style="font-size:88%" rowspan=4|June 15, 2008
|style="font-size:88%" rowspan=4|2008 US Olympic Team Trials
|style="text-align:left;font-size:88%;" rowspan=4| Las Vegas, Nevada
|-
|Win
|17–6
|align=left | Tyrone Lewis
|style="font-size:88%"|2–0, 1–0
|-
|Win
|16–6
|align=left| Ramico Blackmon
|style="font-size:88%"|1–0, 2–1
|-
|Win
|15–6
|align=left | Donny Pritzlaff
|style="font-size:88%"|3–0, 1–1
|-
! style=background:white colspan=7 |
|-
|Win
|14–6
|align=left| Tyrone Lewis
|style="font-size:88%"|3–0, 3–2
|style="font-size:88%" rowspan=3|April 26, 2008
|style="font-size:88%" rowspan=3|2008 US National Championships
|style="text-align:left;font-size:88%;" rowspan=3| Las Vegas, Nevada
|-
|Win
|13–6
|align=left| Ryan Churella
|style="font-size:88%"|4–0, 5–2
|-
|Win
|12–6
|align=left| Ramico Blackmon
|style="font-size:88%"|8–4, 6–0
|-
! style=background:white colspan=7 |
|-
|Win
|11–6
|align=left| Donny Pritzlaff
|style="font-size:88%"|3–0, 1–0
|style="font-size:88%" rowspan=4|November 17, 2007
|style="font-size:88%" rowspan=4|2007 NYAC Open
|style="text-align:left;font-size:88%;" rowspan=4| New York City, New York
|-
|Win
|10–6
|align=left| Ramico Blackman
|style="font-size:88%"|0–2, 1–0, 2–0
|-
|Win
|9–6
|align=left| Rashid Kurbanov
|style="font-size:88%"|2–2, 5–0
|-
|Win
|8–6
|align=left| Matt Gentry
|style="font-size:88%"|3–2, 3–1
|-
! style=background:white colspan=7 |
|-
|Loss
|7–6
|align=left| Matthew Lackey
|style="font-size:88%"|0–4, 2–6
|style="font-size:88%" rowspan=6|October 28, 2007
|style="font-size:88%" rowspan=6|2007 Sunkist International Open
|style="text-align:left;font-size:88%;" rowspan=6| Arizona
|-
|Win
|7–5
|align=left| Travis Koppenhafer
|style="font-size:88%"|4–1, 2–1
|-
|Loss
|6–5
|align=left| Travis Paulson
|style="font-size:88%"|6–0, 1–3, 0–2
|-
|Win
|6–4
|align=left| Joey Hooker
|style="font-size:88%"|4–0, 6–0
|-
|Win
|5–4
|align=left| Chance Goodman
|style="font-size:88%"|TF 6–0, 6–0
|-
|Win
|4–4
|align=left| Matthew Lackey
|style="font-size:88%"|TF 5–3, 6–0
|-
! style=background:white colspan=7 |
|-
|Loss
|3–4
|align=left |  Ramico Blackmon
|style="font-size:88%"|1–4, 1–4
|style="font-size:88%" rowspan=3|June 10, 2007
|style="font-size:88%" rowspan=3|2007 US World Team Trials
|style="text-align:left;font-size:88%;" rowspan=3| Las Vegas, Nevada
|-
|Win
|3–3
|align=left |  Travis Paulson
|style="font-size:88%"|4–3, 1–0
|-
|Loss
|2–3
|align=left |  Donny Pritzlaff
|style="font-size:88%"|0–2, 1–3
|-
! style=background:white colspan=7 |
|-
|Loss
|2–2
|align=left| Donny Pritzlaff
|style="font-size:88%"|0–2, 0–7
|style="font-size:88%" rowspan=4|April 7, 2007
|style="font-size:88%" rowspan=4|2007 US National Championships
|style="text-align:left;font-size:88%;" rowspan=4| Las Vegas, Nevada
|-
|Loss
|2–1
|align=left| Joe Heskett
|style="font-size:88%"|3–2, 2–5, 1–1
|-
|Win
|2–0
|align=left| Tyrone Lewis
|style="font-size:88%"|1–0, 1–1
|-
|Win
|1–0
|align=left| David Bolyard
|style="font-size:88%"|TF 10–3, 7–1

NCAA record

! colspan="8"| NCAA Championships Matches
|-
!  Res.
!  Record
!  Opponent
!  Score
!  Date
!  Event
|-
! style=background:white colspan=6 |2007 NCAA Championships  at 174 lbs
|-
|Win
|17–2
|align=left|Keith Gavin
|style="font-size:88%"|8–2
|style="font-size:88%" rowspan=5|March 15–17, 2007
|style="font-size:88%" rowspan=5|2007 NCAA Division I Wrestling Championships
|-
|Win
|16–2
|align=left|Eric Luedke
|style="font-size:88%"|8–3
|-
|Win
|15–2
|align=left|Matt Palmer
|style="font-size:88%"|Fall
|-
|Win
|14–2
|align=left|Gabriel Dretsch
|style="font-size:88%"|Fall
|-
|Win
|13–2
|align=left|Lloyd Rogers
|style="font-size:88%"|Fall
|-
! style=background:white colspan=6 |2006 NCAA Championships  at 174 lbs
|-
|Win
|12–2
|align=left|Jake Herbert
|style="font-size:88%"|MD 14–2
|style="font-size:88%" rowspan=5|March 16–18, 2006
|style="font-size:88%" rowspan=5|2006 NCAA Division I Wrestling Championships
|-
|Win
|11–2
|align=left|Mike Patrovich
|style="font-size:88%"|TF 21–6
|-
|Win
|10–2
|align=left|Travis Frick
|style="font-size:88%"|TF 19–3
|-
|Win
|9–2
|align=left|Wes Roberts
|style="font-size:88%"|6–4
|-
|Win
|8–2
|align=left|Christian Arellano
|style="font-size:88%"|9–2
|-
! style=background:white colspan=6 |2005 NCAA Championships  at 174 lbs
|-
|Loss
|7–2
|align=left|Chris Pendleton
|style="font-size:88%"|5–10
|style="font-size:88%" rowspan=5|March 17–19, 2005
|style="font-size:88%" rowspan=5|2005 NCAA Division I Wrestling Championships
|-
|Win
|7–1
|align=left|Pete Friedl 
|style="font-size:88%"|7–2
|-
|Win
|6–1
|align=left|E.K. Waldhaus
|style="font-size:88%"|MD 17–4
|-
|Win
|5–1
|align=left|Brady Richardson
|style="font-size:88%"|MD 9–0
|-
|Win
|4–1
|align=left|Mark Himes
|style="font-size:88%"|TF 18–2
|-
! style=background:white colspan=6 |2004 NCAA Championships  at 174 lbs
|-
|Loss
|3–1
|align=left|Chris Pendleton
|style="font-size:88%"|4–11
|style="font-size:88%" rowspan=4|March 18–20, 2004
|style="font-size:88%" rowspan=4|2004 NCAA Division I Wrestling Championships
|-
|Win
|3–0
|align=left|Tyler Nixt
|style="font-size:88%"|4–2
|-
|Win
|2–0
|align=left|Brad Dillon
|style="font-size:88%"|SV 12–7
|-
|Win
|1–0
|align=left|Matt Herrington
|style="font-size:88%"|Fall
|-

Professional boxing record

Submission grappling record
{| class="wikitable" style="font-size:80%; text-align:left;"
|-
!  Result
!  Rec
!  Opponent
!  Method
!  Event
!  Date
!  Division
!  Location
|-
| Win || 12–2 ||  Gerald Meerschaert || Submission (anaconda choke) || rowspan=3|Absolute Grappling Grand Prix at Wisconsin State Fair || rowspan=3|August 5, 2011 || rowspan=3|Absolute || rowspan=3| West Allis, Wisconsin, United States
|-
| Win || 11–2 ||  Rafael "Formiga" Barbosa || Points (23–0)
|-
| Win || 10–2 ||  Lyndon Viteri || Submission (arm-triangle choke)
|-
| Loss || 9–2 ||  Francisco "Sinistro" Iturralde || Advantage points (3–4) || IBJJF 2010 Nogi Jiu Jitsu World Championship || November 7, 2010 || -82 kg (purple) ||  Long Beach, California, United States
|-
| Win || 9–1 ||  Jacob Volkmann || Points (3–1) || rowspan=4|FILA 2009 Grappling World Championship || rowspan=4|December 12, 2009 || rowspan=4|-84 kg || rowspan=4| Fort Lauderdale, Florida, United States
|-
| Win || 8–1 ||  Jeff Funicello || Points (4–0)
|-
| Win || 7–1 ||  Gabriel Kitober || Points (5–4)
|-
| Win || 6–1 ||  Bernardo Serrini || Submission (choke)
|-
| Win || 5–1 ||  Jacob Volkmann || Points (6–0) || rowspan=4|USA Grappling World Team Trials || rowspan=4|October 23, 2009 || rowspan=4|-84 kg || rowspan=4| Phoenix, Arizona, United States
|-
| Win || 4–1 ||  Shannon Ritch || Submission (armbar)
|-
| Win || 3–1 ||  Shane Cross || Submission (north-south choke)
|-
| Win || 2–1 ||  Danny Rubenstein || Submission (D'Arce choke)
|-
| Loss || 1–1 ||  Pablo Popovitch || Submission (toe hold) || rowspan=2|ADCC 2009 Submission Wrestling World Championship || rowspan=2|September 26, 2009 || rowspan=2|-77 kg || rowspan=2| Barcelona, Spain
|-
| Win || 1–0 ||  Toni Linden || Submission (arm-triangle choke)
|-

See also 
 List of Bellator MMA alumni
 List of ONE Championship alumni
 List of male mixed martial artists

References

Notes

External links 
 Ben Askren's Personal Website
Ben Askren's Rokfin Channel
 Ben Askren profile at the National Wrestling Hall of Fame
 
 

1984 births
American male mixed martial artists
American practitioners of Brazilian jiu-jitsu
American male sport wrestlers
Bellator MMA champions
Living people
Mixed martial artists from Missouri
Olympic wrestlers of the United States
Welterweight mixed martial artists
Mixed martial artists utilizing collegiate wrestling
Mixed martial artists utilizing freestyle wrestling
Mixed martial artists utilizing Brazilian jiu-jitsu
Wrestlers at the 2008 Summer Olympics
Missouri Tigers wrestlers
People from Hartland, Wisconsin
Ultimate Fighting Championship male fighters
Arizona State Sun Devils wrestling coaches
ONE Championship champions